The first inauguration of Manuel L. Quezon as the second president of the Philippines and the first president of the Philippine Commonwealth under the United States occurred on November 15, 1935. The inauguration marked the beginning of the first term of Quezon as President and Sergio Osmeña as Vice President.

References 

1935 in the Philippines
Presidency of Manuel L. Quezon
Quezon, Manuel